West Point is an unincorporated community in northern Madison Township, Columbiana County, Ohio, United States. A former coal town, it lies along U.S. Route 30 at its intersection with State Routes 45 and 518, it has the ZIP code 44492. It is part of the Salem micropolitan area.

History

West Point was not officially platted. It grew as a community along the Youngstown and Ohio River Railroad, and was home to the railroad's coal power plant in the early 20th century. A post office called West Point had been in operation from 1836 to 1903, and again from 1955 until 2018.

On July 26, 1863, Union forces defeated Confederate General John Hunt Morgan at the Battle of Salineville following his 1,000 mile raid along the Ohio River. Union General James M. Shackelford and his 3,000 men army, in addition to the Steubenville and New Lisbon militias, captured Morgan and his remaining men in a short firefight west of West Point. The John H. Morgan Surrender Site commemorates the location of the surrender.

Geography

Education
Children in West Point are served by the Beaver Local School District. A West Point Public School was first founded around 1940. A second building was erected in 1953, closing in 2015. The current schools serving West Point are:
 Beaver Local Elementary School – grades K-4
 Beaver Local Middle School – grades 5-8
 Beaver Local High School – grades 9-12

Notable people
Robert Allen, Brigadier general in the Union Army during the American Civil War

References

Unincorporated communities in Ohio
Unincorporated communities in Columbiana County, Ohio
1836 establishments in Ohio
Populated places established in 1836